The Abbot of Crowland was the head of Crowland Abbey, an English monastery built up around the shrine of Saint Guthlac of Crowland by King Æthelbald of Mercia, and refounded as a Benedictine house circa 948. The last abbot was John Wells (also called John Bridges), who was constrained to surrender the monastery to the king's agents during the Dissolution of the Monasteries in 1539.

List of Benedictine abbots of Crowland

Notes

References
 
 
 
 
 

 *
Crowland
Lists of English people